Eberhardtia aurata is a plant in the family Sapotaceae. The twigs are rusty brown. Its habitat is forests. E. aurata is found in China, Vietnam and Borneo.

References

aurata
Trees of China
Trees of Vietnam
Trees of Borneo
Plants described in 1911